This article lists the winners and nominees for the Black Reel Award for Outstanding Television Movie or Limited Series. As of the 2016 ceremony, Luther is the only television movie or limited series to receive more than one nomination. This award is presented to the producers of the production. In May 2017 the category was moved from the film awards as part of the Black Reel Awards for Television honors thus resulting in two separate winners in 2017.

Winners and nominees
Winners are listed first and highlighted in bold.

2000s

2010s

2020s

Programs with multiple nominations
Totals include continuing series, but not sequels or revivals.

3 nominations
 American Crime
 Luther

Total awards by network

 HBO - 11
 Netflix - 2
 BET - 1
 CBS - 1
 FX - 1
 Lifetime - 1
 Showtime - 1
 TV One - 1

References

Black Reel Awards